Leucopogon leptantha is a species of flowering plant in the heath family Ericaceae and is endemic to the south-west of Western Australia. The flowers are arranged singly or in pairs in leaf axils with small bracts and bracteoles less than half as long as the sepals.

The species was first formally described in 1868 by George Bentham in Flora Australiensis from specimens collected by James Drummond between the Moore and Murchison Rivers. The specific epithet (leptanthus) means "slender-flowered".

Leucopogon leptanthus occurs in the Geraldton Sandplains and Swan Coastal Plain bioregions of south-western Western Australia and is listed as "not threatened" by the Government of Western Australia Department of Biodiversity, Conservation and Attractions.

References

leptanthus
Ericales of Australia
Flora of Western Australia
Plants described in 1868
Taxa named by George Bentham